13 is a solo album by American musician and Swans guitarist Norman Westberg. Originally released as a handmade limited edition disc, the album officially released on November 13, 2015 through Lawrence English's Room40 record label.

Background
Recorded in 2013, the album was released as a handmade limited edition of only 75 copies. The album was subsequently remastered and edited for a CD and digital release. The opening track, "Frostbite Falls," was released for streaming on September 18, 2015.

Room40 founder Lawrence English stated on the album:

Track listing
All tracks written by Norman Westberg.

 "Frostbite Falls" — 11:08
 "Bunny Bill" — 10:35
 "Oops, Wrong Hat" — 9:21

Personnel
Album personnel as adapted from Discogs.
 Norman Westberg — bowed bass (1), electric guitar (2), acoustic guitar (3), recording

References

External links
 

2015 albums
Reissue albums